The Kilkenny Senior Football Championship is an annual gaelic football competition between the top Kilkenny GAA clubs. The winners represent Kilkenny in the Leinster Intermediate Club Football Championship, the winners of which progress to the All-Ireland Intermediate Club Football Championship.

Wins listed by club

Finals listed by year

 1998 No replay - Glenmore won in a replay
 1957 - Unfinished - Railyard awarded tit;e
 1948 - Reply ordered after objection
 1940 Glenmore awarded title on objection
 1931 Played on a league basis
 1927 Glenmore 1-02, Cotterstown 0-02  Declared null & void 
 1911 Knocktopher awarded title after an objection
 1920 Reply ordered following an objection
 1901 Unfinished. Rower claimed they scored a goal. Knocktopher awarded match.
 1889 Kells 3-05, Thomas Larkins 0-02; This was declared not the final and Ballyhale was allowed back in championship. Kells refused to play them, and Ballyhale awarded title

References

External links
 Official Kilkenny Website
 Kilkenny on Hoganstand
 Kilkenny Club GAA

 
Kilkenny GAA club championships
Gaelic football competitions in County Kilkenny
Senior Gaelic football county championships